Busk may refer to:

Busk (corsetry), the rigid element of a corset placed at the center front
Busking, or street performance

Places
Busk, Cumbria, a hamlet in Cumbria, England
Busk, Greater Manchester, a locality in Greater Manchester, England
Busk, Ukraine, a city in Lviv Oblast, Ukraine
Busk Raion, a former raion in Lviv Oblast, Ukraine, containing the city

Other
Busk (surname)
Busk, or Green Corn Ceremony, a ceremony of the Muscogee people